Lusso may refer to:

 Lusso (magazine), a U.K.-based lifestyle magazine 
 Lusso, a Unilever ice cream brand in Switzerland
 Hasselblad Lusso, a variant of the Sony α ILCE-7R digital mirrorless camera
 L or Lusso, a Fiat 500 model (1968–1972)
 Ferrari 250 GT Lusso, a luxury Italian sports car